Sociedad Deportiva Balmaseda Fútbol Club is a Spanish football team based in Balmaseda, Biscay, in the autonomous community of Basque Country. Founded on 2 August 1914 it currently plays in Tercera División – Group 4, holding home games at La Baluga, which has a capacity of 1,500 spectators.

History 
Sociedad Deportiva Balmaseda Fútbol Club was founded on August 2, 1914. On the same day the team debuted against Getxo Arenas Club reserve team in the Campo del Nocedal.

Season to season

23 seasons in Tercera División

Honours
División de Honor: 2010–11

References

External links
Official website 
Arefe Regional team profile 

Football clubs in the Basque Country (autonomous community)
Association football clubs established in 1914
1914 establishments in Spain